Siculus Flaccus (date uncertain) was an ancient Roman gromaticus (land surveyor), and writer in Latin on land surveying. His work was included in a collection of gromatic treatises in the 6th century AD.

Siculus Flaccus made the distinction between public roads (viae publicae), local roads (viae vicinales) and private or estate roads (viae privatae) in Roman Italy.

See also
Roman roads

References

External links
Siculus Flaccus at IntraText Digital Library

Latin-language writers
Ancient Roman writers
Ancient Roman surveyors
Year of birth unknown
Year of death unknown